Weekend Lunchtime is a British lunchtime news programme airing between 12pm and 2pm on weekends which was broadcast on Sky News from 2007 to 2011. It featured a mix of news and sport. The slot was branded on air as Sky News with Lorna Dunkley & Nick Powell.

2007 British television series debuts
2011 British television series endings
Sky News
Sky UK original programming
Sky television news shows